An Ottomanist may be: 
 an adherent of Ottomanism, an ideology developed in the late Ottoman Empire
 a scholar of Ottoman studies